CBS Sports is the sports division of the American television network CBS. Its headquarters are in the CBS Building on W 52nd Street in Midtown Manhattan, New York City, with programs produced out of Studios 43 and 44 of the CBS Broadcast Center on W 57th Street.

CBS' premier sports properties include the National Football League (NFL), Southeastern Conference (SEC) football, NCAA Division I college basketball (including telecasts of the NCAA men's basketball tournament),  PGA Tour golf, the Masters Tournament and the PGA Championship, and the UEFA Champions League.

CBS Sports was honored at the 59th Annual Technology & Engineering Emmy Awards for Outstanding Achievement in Advanced Media Technology for Synchronous Enhancement of Original Television Content for Interactive Use for its program March Madness on Demand.

Programs throughout the years

Current programs
 PGA Tour on CBS (1956–present)
 The Masters (1956–present) (co-production with ESPN)
 PGA Championship (1991–present)
 CBS Sports Spectacular (1960–present)
NCAA on CBS
 College football (1950–1966, 1968–present)
 Sun Bowl (1968–present)
 SEC on CBS (First pick of SEC games, 1996–2023)
 SEC Championship Game (2001-2023)
 Army–Navy Game (1962–1963, 1982, 1984–1990, 1996–present)
 Mountain West on CBS (2020–present)
 Big Ten on CBS (1982–1986, 2023–present)
 Big Ten Football Championship Game (2024, 2028)
 College Basketball on CBS (1981–present)
 NCAA tournament (1982–present, national championship every other year since 2016) (co-production with Turner Sports and National Collegiate Athletic Association)
 Semifinals and Finals of Big Ten men's basketball tournament (1998–present)
 Finals of Big Ten women's basketball tournament (2024–present)
 NFL on CBS (1956–1993, 1998–present)
 The NFL Today (1961–1993, 1998–present)
 Super Bowl: I (shared with NBC), II, IV, VI, VIII, X, XII, XIV, XVI, XVIII, XXI, XXIV, XXVI, XXXV, XXXVIII, XLI, XLIV, XLVII, 50, LIII, LV, LVIII, LXII, and LXVI
 NFL on Nickelodeon (2021–present) (co-production with Nickelodeon and CBS Sports)
 Showtime Championship Boxing (1986–present) (co-production with Showtime Networks)
 Inside the NFL (2008–present) (co-production with Showtime Networks)
 PBR on CBS (2013–present)
 Big3 (2019–present)
 Tennis on CBS
 World TeamTennis (2019–present)
 Davis Cup (2020–present) (USA matches only for qualifiers)
 Major League Rugby Finals (2019–present)
 Soccer on CBS Sports
 NWSL (2020–present)
 UEFA Champions League (2020–present)
 UEFA Champions League final (2021-present)
 UEFA Europa League (2020–present)
 UEFA Europa Conference League (2021–present)
 UEFA Super Cup (2020–present)
 Serie A  (2021–present)
 WNBA (2020–present)
 Formula E (2021–present)
 Combate Global (2021–present)

Former programs
 Major League Baseball on CBS (1947–1950, 1955–1965, 1990–1993)
 World Series:  (Games 3 and 4), –, –
 Thoroughbred Racing on CBS (1952–1985)
 Kentucky Derby (1952–1974)
 Preakness Stakes (1960–1976)
 Belmont Stakes (1960–1985)
 Little League World Series (1953)
 College Football on CBS
 Orange Bowl (1953–1961; 1996–1998)
 Gator Bowl (1956–1963, 1986–1987, 2007–2010)
 Cotton Bowl Classic (1958–1992, 1996–1998)
 Blue-Gray Football Classic (1965)
 Fiesta Bowl (1974–1977, 1996–1998)
 Blockbuster/CarQuest Bowl (1991–1995)
 Peach Bowl (1978–1985)
 Pac-10 Conference (1982–1986)
 College Football Association (1987–1990)
 Big East Conference (1996–2000)
 Navy–Notre Dame (1996–2018, even-numbered years only)
 Mountain West Championship Game (2013–2014)
 Division I-AA Championship Game (1982, 1990–1994)
 Arizona Bowl (2020)
 NBA on CBS (1973–1990)
 NHL on CBS (1956–1960, 1966–1972, and 1980)
 Olympics on CBS
 Winter Olympic Games (1960, 1992, 1994, 1998)
 Summer Olympic Games (1960)
 Olympics on TNT (1992, 1994, 1998) (co-production with Turner Sports)
 NASCAR on CBS (1960–2000)
 Daytona 500 (1979–2000)
 National Professional Soccer League (1967)
 Tennis on CBS
 US Open (1968–2014)
 Dockers / Visa Open (1994-2009)
 French Open (1980–1982)
 Miami Open (2000–2013)
 US Open Series (2004–2014)
 Soccer on CBS Sports
 North American Soccer League (1969, 1974–1976)
 1974 FIFA World Cup
 Major Indoor Soccer League
 NCAA Men's Soccer Championship
 Formula One (1960-1961, 1977–1981, 1983–1988, 2005–2006)
 NCAA Division I Women's Basketball Championship (1982–1995)
 NCAA Tightrope Championships (1985-2003)
 Tour de France (1987–2010)
 College World Series on CBS (1988–2002)
 Championship Auto Racing Teams (1989–1991, 2002–2003, 2005–2007)
 Indy Racing League (1997–1998)
 Superstar Racing Experience (2021–2022)
 Professional Bowlers Tour (1998–1999)
 Title Night (1998) (co-production with Turner Sports)
 PGA Tour on CBS
 LPGA Championship (1999–2005)
 Senior Players Championship (2001–2006)
 Kraft Nabisco Championship (2006–2010)
 English Open (1996-2009)
 American Le Mans Series (2005–2006, 2010)
 Elite Xtreme Combat (2008)
 Strikeforce (2009–2010)
 Major League Lacrosse (2013–2017)
 Arena Football League on CBS (2013–2018)
 Alliance of American Football (2019)

Notable personalities (past and present)

Present

Play-by-play
 NFL on CBS – Jim Nantz, Ian Eagle, Kevin Harlan, Greg Gumbel, Andrew Catalon, Spero Dedes, Tom McCarthy, Beth Mowins
 NFL on Nickelodeon - Noah Eagle
 PGA Tour on CBS – Jim Nantz, Andrew Catalon, Verne Lundquist
 College Football on CBS Sports – Brad Nessler, Tom McCarthy, Rich Waltz, John Sadak, Jason Horowitz
 College Basketball on CBS Sports – Jim Nantz, Ian Eagle, Kevin Harlan, Spero Dedes, Andrew Catalon, Carter Blackburn, Brad Nessler, John Sadak, Tom McCarthy, Rich Waltz
 NCAA March Madness – Jim Nantz, Brian Anderson, Ian Eagle, Kevin Harlan, Brad Nessler, Spero Dedes, Andrew Catalon, Carter Blackburn, Tom McCarthy, Lisa Byington
 Soccer on CBS - Clive Tyldesley, Andres Cordero, Adrian Garcia Marquez, JP Dellacamera, Jenn Hildreth
 BIG3 – Brian Custer, Carter Blackburn, Ed Cohen
 SRX - Allen Bestwick

Color commentators
 NFL on CBS – Tony Romo, Charles Davis, Trent Green, Adam Archuleta, James Lofton, Jay Feely, Tiki Barber, Gene Steratore
 NFL on Nickelodeon - Nate Burleson, Gabrielle Nevaeh Green, Iain Armitage, Rob Gronkowski, Mia Burleson
 PGA Tour on CBS – Sir Nick Faldo, Ian Baker-Finch, Trevor Immelman, Frank Nobilo
 College Football on CBS Sports – Gary Danielson, Rick Neuheisel, Aaron Taylor, Gene Steratore, Aaron Murray
 College Basketball on CBS Sports - Grant Hill, Clark Kellogg, Bill Raftery, Dan Bonner, Jim Spanarkel, Steve Lappas, Gene Steratore, Pete Gillen, Avery Johnson, Jay Wright
 NCAA March Madness – Grant Hill, Bill Raftery, Jim Jackson, Jim Spanarkel, Dan Bonner, Stan Van Gundy, Brendan Haywood, Debbie Antonelli, Steve Lappas, Steve Smith, Avery Johnson, Gene Steratore
 Soccer on CBS - Robert Green, Ray Hudson, Matteo Bonetti, Maurice Edu, Marcelo Balboa, Janelly Farías, Kaylyn Kyle, Aly Wagner, Lori Lindsey
 BIG3 – Jim Jackson, Lisa Leslie (when not coaching), Avery Johnson
 SRX - Willy T. Ribbs, Conor Daly

Reporters
 NFL on CBS – Tracy Wolfson, Evan Washburn, Melanie Collins, Jay Feely, Amanda Balionis, A. J. Ross, Aditi Kinkhabwala, Michael Grady
 NFL on Nickelodeon - Tyler Perry's Young Dylan, Dylan Schefter
 The NFL Today – Jonathan Jones
 PGA Tour on CBS – Dottie Pepper, Colt Knost, Amanda Balionis
 College Football on CBS Sports – Jenny Dell, Sherree Burress
 College Basketball on CBS - Tracy Wolfson, Jamie Erdahl, Dana Jacobson, Evan Washburn
 NCAA March Madness – Tracy Wolfson, Allie LaForce, Evan Washburn, Lauren Shehadi, Dana Jacobson, A.J. Ross, Jamie Erdahl, Andy Katz
 BIG3 – John Salley
 Soccer on CBS - Jules Breach, Guillem Balagué, Raphael Honigstein, Nico Cantor, Jenny Chiu, Aaron West, Christine Cupo, Marisa Pilla
 SRX - Willy T. Ribs, Matt Yocum

Studio hosts
 The NFL Today – James Brown, Nate Burleson
 College Football on CBS Sports – Adam Zucker, Brent Stover
 Inside College Basketball – Greg Gumbel, Adam Zucker, Dana Jacobson
 Road to the Final Four – Greg Gumbel, Ernie Johnson, Adam Zucker,  Adam Lefkoe, Nabil Karim
 Soccer on CBS – Kate Abdo, Jules Breach, Poppy Miller
 SRX – Lindsay Czarniak

Studio Analysts
 The NFL Today – Nate Burleson, Bill Cowher, Boomer Esiason, Phil Simms, Jim Rome
 College Football on CBS Sports – Brian Jones, Rick Neuheisel, Houston Nutt
 Inside College Basketball – Clark Kellogg, Seth Davis, Wally Szczerbiak, Jay Wright
 Road to the Final Four – Clark Kellogg, Seth Davis, Wally Szczerbiak, Charles Barkley, Kenny Smith, Brendan Haywood, Candace Parker, Jay Wright
 Soccer on CBS - Thierry Henry, Jamie Carragher, Peter Schmeichel, Micah Richards, Alex Scott, Julien Laurens, Lianne Sanderson, Roberto Martinez, Giuseppe Rossi, Mike Grella, Marco Messina, Clint Dempsey, Oguchi Onyewu, Charlie Davies

Former

Play-by-play
 NFL on CBS – Marv Albert, Brian Anderson, Gary Bender, Jack Buck, Don Criqui, Irv Cross, Mike Emrick, Dick Enberg, Frank Glieber, Mike Gorman, Gus Johnson, Craig Bolerjack, Verne Lundquist, Bill Macatee, Sean McDonough, Brent Musburger, Gary Bender, Jim McKay, Tim Ryan, Ted Robinson, Ray Scott, Chris Schenkel, Vin Scully, Dick Stockton, Don Criqui, Pat Summerall, Chris Schenkel, Dave Sims, Michele Tafoya, Gary Thorne, Steve Zabriskie
 Thursday Night Football – Jim Nantz, Greg Gumbel, Ian Eagle, Kevin Harlan
 PGA Tour on CBS – Sean McDonough, Brent Musburger, Vin Scully, Pat Summerall
 SEC on CBS – Gary Bender, Craig Bolerjack, Don Criqui, Frank Glieber, Verne Lundquist, Brent Musburger, Noah Eagle
 College Basketball on CBS – Gary Bender, Bob Carpenter, Irv Cross, Jim Durham, Mike Emrick, Dick Enberg, Frank Glieber, Mike Gorman, Bill Macatee, Jim McKay, Sean McDonough, Brent Musburger, Tim Ryan, Ted Robinson, Ray Scott, Chris Schenkel, Vin Scully, Dave Sims, Pat Summerall, Michele Tafoya, Gary Thorne, Steve Zabriskie
 Major League Baseball on CBS – Jack Buck, Dizzy Dean, Sean McDonough, Vin Scully, Dick Stockton
 NBA on CBS – Gary Bender, Bob Carpenter, Irv Cross, Jim Durham, Mike Emrick, Dick Enberg, Frank Glieber, Mike Gorman, Jim McKay, Sean McDonough, Brent Musburger, Tim Ryan, Ted Robinson, Ray Scott, Chris Schenkel, Vin Scully, Dave Sims, Pat Summerall, Gary Thorne, Steve Zabriskie
 NHL on CBS – Dan Kelly, Bud Palmer
 Olympics on CBS – Phil Liggett, Brad Nessler, Bud Palmer, Tim Ryan, Chris Schenkel, Al Trautwig
 NASCAR on CBS – Chris Economaki, Mike Joy, Ken Squier, Bill Stephens
 Tennis on CBS – Bud Collins, Ian Eagle, Dick Enberg, Frank Glieber, Bill Macatee, Sean McDonough, Ted Robinson, Jim Nantz, Pat O'Brien, Tim Ryan, Brent Musburger, Vin Scully, Ken Squier, Pat Summerall
 Tour de France – Phil Liggett, John Tesh, Al Trautwig
 National Professional Soccer League – Jack Whitaker

Analysts
 NFL on CBS – Terry Bradshaw, Dan Dierdorf, John Madden, Tom Brookshier, Frank Gifford, Hank Stram, Pat Summerall, Solomon Wilcots, Bruce Arians, Steve Tasker, Dan Fouts, Rich Gannon
 Thursday Night Football – Tony Romo, Phil Simms, Marshall Faulk, Steve Mariucci, Michael Irvin, Kurt Warner, LaDainian Tomlinson, Bill Cowher, Deion Sanders, Willie McGinest, Trent Green, Dan Fouts, Rich Gannon
 PGA Tour on CBS – Ken Venturi
 College Football on CBS – Craig James, Rich Perez
 College Basketball on CBS – Al McGuire, Quinn Buckner, Stephen Bardo, Kareem Abdul-Jabbar, Bill Walton, Doug Collins, Rick Barry, Billy Cunningham, Tom Heinsohn, Rod Hundley, Bill Russell, Mendy Rudolph, Sonny Hill, Oscar Robertson, Steve Kerr, Matt Guokas, Larry Conley, Chris Webber
 Major League Baseball on CBS – Jim Kaat, Tim McCarver
 NBA on CBS – Al McGuire, Quinn Buckner, Stephen Bardo, Kareem Abdul-Jabbar, Bill Walton, Doug Collins, Rick Barry, Billy Cunningham, Tom Heinsohn, Rod Hundley, Bill Russell, Mendy Rudolph, Sonny Hill, Oscar Robertson, Steve Kerr, Matt Guokas, Larry Conley
 NHL on CBS – Fred Cusick
 NASCAR on CBS – Buddy Baker, Neil Bonnett, David Hobbs, Ned Jarrett
 Tennis on CBS – Julie Anthony, Mary Carillo, Jim Courier, Julie Heldman, Jack Kramer, John McEnroe, Patrick McEnroe, Tony Trabert
 National Professional Soccer League – Danny Blanchflower

Reporters
 NFL on CBS – Lesley Visser, Pat O’Brien, Armen Keteyian, Michele Tafoya, Bonnie Bernstein, Jamie Erdahl, Jenny Dell, John Schriffen
 Thursday Night Football – Jenny Dell, Tracy Wolfson, Evan Washburn, Jamie Erdahl, Stacey Dales
 NFL on Nickelodeon – Lex Lumpkin
 PGA Tour on CBS – Dick Enberg
 College Football on CBS – Sam Ryan, Tracy Wolfson, Allie LaForce, John Schriffen, Jamie Erdahl
 College Basketball on CBS – Bonnie Bernstein, Sam Ryan, Michele Tafoya, Solomon Wilcots, Rachel Nichols, Otis Livingston, John Schriffen, Jamie Erdahl, Lisa Byington
 Major League Baseball on CBS – Jim Gray
 NASCAR on CBS – Dave Despain, 
 Olympics on CBS – Harry Reasoner, Mary Carillo, Lesley Visser, Michael Barkann, Craig James, Darren Pang
 Tennis on CBS – Jill Arrington, Bonnie Bernstein, John Dockery, Mary Joe Fernández, Andrea Joyce, Summer Sanders, Michele Tafoya, Lesley Visser, Tracy Wolfson

Studio hosts
 NFL on CBS – Phyllis George, Brent Musburger, Pat O'Brien, Jim Nantz, Greg Gumbel
 College Football on CBS – Tim Brando, Greg Gumbel, Brent Musburger
 NBA on CBS - Jim Nantz, Dick Stockton, Brent Musburger, Pat O'Brien, Sam Ryan
 College Basketball on CBS – Jim Nantz, Dick Stockton, Brent Musburger, Pat O'Brien, Sam Ryan
 CBS Sports Spectacular – Jack Whitaker, Dick Stockton, Brent Musburger, John Tesh
 Thursday Night Football – James Brown, Rich Eisen

Behind the scenes
 Don Robertson

Presidents of CBS Sports
 Robert Wussler (1976–1978)
 Frank M. Smith, Jr. (1978–1980)
 Van Gordon Sauter (1980–1981)
 Neal Pilson (1981–1984)
 Peter Lund (1984–1986)
 Neal Pilson (1986–1994)
 David Kenin (1994–1996)
 Sean McManus (1996–2013)
 David Berson (2013–present)

CBS Sports Network

CBS Sports Network is a sports-oriented American digital cable and satellite channel that is operated by Paramount Global through CBS Sports. Launched as the National College Sports Network in 2002, then renamed as College Sports Television in 2003, CBS's then-parent company Viacom acquired the network in 2005 and later renamed it CBS College Sports Network in 2008. The network had always focused on college sports, but in 2011, CBS rebranded the network as CBS Sports Network as a move to reposition the network to include mainstream sports—including coverage of minor professional sports leagues such as the Arena Football League and Major League Lacrosse, although college sports are still aired frequently by the network.

CBS Sports Radio

CBS Sports Radio is a sports radio network that launched on September 4, 2012, with hourly sports news updates. It began offering a full 24-hour schedule of sports talk programming on January 2, 2013. CBS Sports Radio, although originally owned by CBS Radio, is now owned directly by Paramount Global and operated by Audacy, with Westwood One handling distribution and marketing of the network. Sports radio stations that are owned by Entercom and Cumulus Media carry part of the full schedule of programming, while eight Entercom-owned stations carry network programming throughout the day. In addition to carriage on terrestrial stations, CBS Sports Radio also streams its programming on the internet.

CBS Sports HQ

On February 26, 2018, CBS Sports launched CBS Sports HQ, a 24-hour streaming sports news channel modeled after CBS News's streaming news channel.

CBS Sports Digital 
The online arm of CBS Sports is CBSSports.com. CBS purchased SportsLine.com in 2004, and today CBSSports.com is part of Paramount Streaming. On February 26, 2018, following up on the success of their online news network CBSN, CBS Sports launched CBS Sports HQ, a 24/7, online only, linear sports news network. The network focuses entirely on sports news, results, highlights and analysis. (CBS Sports college sports and golf programming that it distributes over the air is generally made available for free via separate streams, as are a limited number of NFL national telecasts; the remainder requires a Paramount+ (formerly CBS All Access) subscription to be viewed online, with CBS Sports Network programming requiring a TV Everywhere subscription.)

Branding
On August 31, 2013, CBS Sports rolled out its previous graphics and animation package that was first used in the network's coverage of Super Bowl XLVII. Additionally, in compliance with the Active Format Description #10 code, CBS Sports switched to a 16:9 aspect ratio letterbox presentation used for all sports programming, including the SEC on CBS and the NFL on CBS broadcasts.

On November 30, 2015, CBS Sports unveiled a new rectangular logo, which premiered on-air during its coverage of Super Bowl 50, and was intended to provide consistency between the division's platforms. It replaced an existing logo that had dated back to 1981. In October 2020, CBS announced that all of its major divisions would adopt a unified branding scheme built around the components of the CBS eye logo, a new sonic branding, and TT Norms Pro as a corporate typeface. The implementation of the branding by CBS Sports launched during the lead-up to Super Bowl LV, which introduced a new on-air graphics package that conforms to the corporate design language.

See also

 CBSSports.com
 CBS Sports Network
 CBS Sports Radio
 Paramount Global

Main competitors
 ESPN
 ESPN2
 ESPNews
 ESPNU
 ESPN on ABC
 ACC Network
 SEC Network
 Fox Sports
 FS1
 FS2
 Big Ten Network
 NBC Sports
 USA
 Peacock
 CNBC
 Warner Bros. Discovery Sports
 AT&T SportsNet
 Univisión
 TUDN

References

External links

 

 
1955 establishments in New York City
Webby Award winners